Howieson is a surname. Notable people with the surname include:

Cameron Howieson (born 1994), New Zealand footballer
Jack Howieson (born 1981), English rugby league footballer
Jimmy Howieson (1900–1974), Scottish footballer

See also
Howison